The Hautes-Gorges-de-la-Rivière-Malbaie National Park is a provincial park in the Charlevoix region of Quebec, Canada. Centring on the Malbaie River Gorge, it is the centrepiece of the UNESCO Charlevoix biosphere reserve. Despite its name, it is not in Canada's national park system, nor administered by Parks Canada. It is administered by the Société des établissements de plein air du Québec (Sépaq). The park can be reached via a local road,  northwards from Route 138 in Saint-Aimé-des-Lacs.

The  Grands-Ormes Ecological Reserve is an enclave within the park.

The park lies within the Eastern forest-boreal transition ecoregion.

Description 
The park also encloses the Grands-Ormes Ecological Reserve.

The park is managed by the Quebec government through the Société des établissements de plein air du Québec (Quebec Outdoor Establishments Society) (SÉPAQ).

History 
Canadians first visited the area in course of exploration of the Malbaie River only in the first half of the 19th century. In the beginning of the 20th century, commercial exploitation of the forest started, accompanied by timber rafting. At the same time, tourists started to frequent the area. William Hume Blake was one of the early tourists who repeatedly visited the gorge. On 13 September 1988, the regional park was opened. In 1989, it became part of the UNESCO Charlevoix World biosphe reserve. In 2000, the government of Quebec officially opened the national park.
 1970: The first field surveys take place by the Ministry of Tourism, Hunting and Fishing to specify what a park project could be in the Hautes-Gorges.
 1975: Even if it is not yet a National Park in the legal sense, the Parc des Hautes-Gorges-de-la-Rivière-Malbaie appears for the first time in the programming of the Ministry of Tourism, Hunting and some fishing.
 1977: An investment of $64000 is made there by the Ministry of Lands and Forests in order to build basic reception facilities.
 1979: While the Laurentides Wildlife Reserve is about to be created, the Ministry of Recreation, Hunting and Fishing gives up creating at the same time the Hautes-Gorges park as expected since this would have increased the compensation costs to be paid to the logging company too much then benefiting from a forest concession which included these two parks.
 1983: The Ministry of Recreation, Hunting and Fishing announces its intention to create the Hautes-Gorges-de-la-Rivière-Malbaie park during the Summit on the economy of the greater region of the Capital.
 1985: The last logging takes place in the Hautes-Gorges since the Ministry of Energy and Resources proceeds to the retrocession of the part of the concession of the Donohue company located in the park project.
 1996: The flood of July 19 (see Saguenay Flood) wreaks havoc in the park and it is closed for the rest of the season because its roads have become unusable.
 2000: Legal creation of the park by the Government of Quebec, thus becoming the 20th park of the Parc-Québec network.

Geography 
The park is located in a mountainous environment, in the chain of the Laurentian Mountains, more precisely in the east of the Jacques-Cartier Massif. The rugged terrain of the Hautes-Gorges structures the landscape of the park into five major physiographic units:
Flat or gently sloping areas are rare and mainly located in the depressions of Lac Scott and Ruisseau Blanc.
 Vallée de la rivière Malbaie: as its name suggests, this unit includes the valley of the Malbaie River as well as the peaks adjacent to it. The valley and its river are initially oriented north-south to become abruptly east-west in the sector aptly named L'Équerre.
A few summits over  also exist there, particularly in the Porc-Épic lake sector.

Recreation 
Activities available in the park include hiking, riverboat cruises, canoeing, kayaking, fishing, cycling, rabaska, birding, ice climbing, and camping.

There are three camp sites in the park, one of which can only be reached by canoeing or biking.

Cars are not allowed in the park. There is a parking at the gate, where one needs to register and pay to get access to the park. From there, visitors may take a bus that will get them to some points in the park, and to the Draveur Service Centre.

Gallery

See also 
 National Parks of Canada
 List of Quebec national parks
 Saint-Aimé-des-Lacs, Quebec
 Rivière des Martres
 La Malbaie, Quebec
 Malbaie River
 Montagne des Érables

References

External links 

 Official website of the park

National parks of Quebec
Protected areas of Capitale-Nationale